Max Ferdinand Scheler (22 August 1874 – 19 May 1928) was a German philosopher known for his work in phenomenology, ethics, and philosophical anthropology. Considered in his lifetime one of the most prominent German philosophers, Scheler developed the philosophical method of Edmund Husserl, the founder of phenomenology. Given that school's utopian ambitions of re-founding all of human knowledge, Scheler was nicknamed the "Adam of the philosophical paradise" by José Ortega y Gasset. 

After Scheler's death in 1928, Martin Heidegger affirmed, with Ortega y Gasset, that all philosophers of the century were indebted to Scheler and praised him as "the strongest philosophical force in modern Germany, nay, in contemporary Europe and in contemporary philosophy as such." 

Scheler was an important influence on the theology of Pope John Paul II, who wrote his 1954 doctoral thesis on "An Evaluation of the Possibility of Constructing a Christian Ethics on the Basis of the System of Max Scheler", and later wrote many articles on Scheler's philosophy. Thanks to John Paul II as well as to Scheler's influence on his student Edith Stein, Scheler has exercised a notable influence on Catholic thought to this day.

Life and career

Childhood
Max Scheler was born in Munich, Germany, on 22 August 1874, to a well-respected orthodox Jewish family. He had "a rather typical late nineteenth century upbringing in a Jewish household bent on assimilation and agnosticism." As an adolescent he turned to Catholicism, and Catholic thinkers such as St. Augustine and Pascal would significantly influence his philosophical positions.

Student years
Scheler began his university studies as a medical student at the University of Munich; he then transferred to the University of Berlin where he abandoned medicine in favor of philosophy and sociology, studying under Wilhelm Dilthey, Carl Stumpf and Georg Simmel. He moved to the University of Jena in 1896 where he studied under Rudolf Eucken, at that time a very popular philosopher who went on to win the Nobel Prize for literature in 1908. (Eucken corresponded with William James, a noted proponent of philosophical pragmatism, and throughout his life, Scheler entertained a strong interest in pragmatism.) It was at Jena that Scheler completed his doctorate and his habilitation and began his professional life as a teacher. His doctoral thesis, completed in 1897, was entitled Beiträge zur Feststellung der Beziehungen zwischen den logischen und ethischen Prinzipien (Contribution to establishing the relationships between logical and ethical principles). In 1898 he made a trip to Heidelberg and met Max Weber, who also had a significant impact on his thought. He earned his habilitation in 1899 with a thesis entitled Die transzendentale und die psychologische Methode (The transcendental and the psychological method) directed by Eucken. He became a lecturer (Privatdozent) at the University of Jena in 1901.

First period (Jena, Munich, Gottingen and World War I)
Scheler taught at Jena from 1901 until 1906, then returned to the University of Munich where he taught from 1907 to 1910. At this time his study of Edmund Husserl's phenomenology deepened. Scheler had first met Husserl at Halle in 1901. At Munich, Husserl's own teacher Franz Brentano was still lecturing, and Scheler joined the Phenomenological Circle in Munich, centred around M. Beck, Th. Conrad, J. Daubert, M. Geiger, Dietrich von Hildebrand, Theodor Lipps, and Alexander Pfänder. Scheler was never a direct student of Husserl's, and in fact, their relationship was somewhat strained. In later years Scheler was rather critical of Husserl's Logical Investigations (1900/01) and Ideas I (1913), and he also was to harbor reservations about Being and Time by Martin Heidegger.

At Munich Scheler was caught up in the conflict between the predominantly Catholic university and the local Socialist media, which led to the loss of his Munich teaching position in 1910. He then briefly lectured at the Philosophical Society of Göttingen, where he made and renewed acquaintances with Theodore Conrad, Hedwig Conrad-Martius (an ontologist and Conrad's wife), Moritz Geiger, Jean Hering, Roman Ingarden, Dietrich von Hildebrand, Husserl, Alexandre Koyré, and Adolf Reinach. Edith Stein was one of his students, impressed by him "way beyond philosophy". In 1911, he moved to Berlin as an unattached writer and grew close to Walther Rathenau and Werner Sombart.

When his first marriage, to Amalie von Dewitz, ended in divorce, Scheler married Märit Furtwängler in 1912, who was the sister of the noted conductor Wilhelm Furtwängler. Scheler's son by his first wife, Wolf Scheler, became troublesome after the divorce, often stealing from his father, and in 1923, after Wolf had tried to force him to pay for a prostitute, Scheler sent him to his former student Kurt Schneider, a psychiatrist, for diagnosis. Schneider diagnosed Wolf as not being mentally ill, but a psychopath, using two diagnostic categories (Gemütlos and Haltlos) essentially equivalent to today's "antisocial personality disorder".

Along with other Munich phenomenologists such as Reinach, Pfänder and Geiger, Scheler co-founded in 1912 the famous Jahrbuch für Philosophie und phänomenologische Forschung, with Husserl as main editor. Scheler's first major work, published in 1913, was strongly influenced by phenomenology: Zur Phänomenologie und Theorie der Sympathiegefühle und von Liebe und Hass (English translation: The Nature of Sympathy, 1954).

During World War I (1914–1918), Scheler was initially drafted, but later discharged because of astigmia of the eyes. He was passionately devoted to the defence of both the war and Germany's cause during the conflict.

Second period (Cologne)
In 1919 Scheler became professor of philosophy and sociology at the University of Cologne. He stayed there until 1928.

After 1921 he disassociated himself in public from Catholic teaching and even from the Judeo-Christian God,Frings, Manfred S. (1997) The mind of Max Scheler: the first comprehensive guide based on the complete works p.9 committing himself to pantheism and philosophical anthropology.

His thinking increasingly took on a political character, and he became the only scholar of rank in the Weimar Republic to warn in public speeches against the dangers both of National Socialism and Communism. He met the Russian existentialist philosopher Nikolai Berdyaev in Berlin in 1923. In 1927 he delivered talks in Berlin on 'Politics and Morals' and 'The Idea of Eternal Peace and Pacifism'. He argued that capitalism is not so much an economic system as a calculating, globally growing 'mind-set'. While economic capitalism may have had some roots in ascetic Calvinism (as argued by Max Weber), its mind-set, however, has its origin in modern, subconscious angst as expressed in increasing needs for financial and other securities, for protection and personal safeguards as well as for rational manageability of all things, which ultimately subordinates the value of the individual person. Scheler called instead for a new era of culture and values, which he called 'The World-Era of Adjustment'.

Scheler also advocated an international university to be set up in Switzerland and was at that time supportive of programs such as 'continuing education' and of what he seems to have been the first to call a 'United States of Europe'. He deplored the gap existing in Germany between power and mind, a gap which he regarded as the very source of an impending dictatorship and the greatest obstacle to the establishment of German democracy. Five years after his death, the Nazi dictatorship (1933–1945) suppressed Scheler's work.

Towards the end of his life many invitations were extended to him from China, India, Japan, and Russia. On the advice of his physician, he cancelled reservations on the Star Line to the United States.

In 1927 at a conference in Darmstadt, near Frankfurt, arranged by the new-age philosopher Hermann Keyserling, Scheler delivered a lengthy lecture entitled 'Man's Particular Place' (Die Sonderstellung des Menschen), published later in much abbreviated form as Die Stellung des Menschen im Kosmos [literally: 'Man's Position in the Cosmos']. His well-known oratorical style and delivery captivated his audience for about four hours.

Early in 1928, he accepted a new position at the University of Frankfurt. There he looked forward to conversing with Ernst Cassirer, Karl Mannheim, Rudolph Otto and Richard Wilhelm, all of whom are occasionally referred to in his writings. 

Scheler had developed the habit of smoking between sixty and eighty cigarettes a day which contributed to a series of heart attacks throughout 1928, forcing him to cancel any travel plans. On May 19, 1928, he died in a Frankfurt hospital due to complications from a severe heart attack. His plans to publish a major work in Anthropology in 1929 were curtailed by his premature death.

Philosophical contributions

Love and the "phenomenological attitude"

When the editors of Geisteswissenschaften invited Scheler (about 1913/14) to write on the then developing philosophical method of phenomenology, Scheler indicated that the phenomenological movement was not defined by universally accepted theses but by a "common bearing and attitude toward philosophical problems." Scheler disagrees with Husserl that phenomenology is a method of strict phenomenological reduction, but rather "an attitude of spiritual seeing...something which otherwise remains hidden...." Calling phenomenology a method fails to take seriously the phenomenological domain of original experience: the givenness of phenomenological facts (essences or values as a priori) "before they have been fixed by logic," and prior to assuming a set of criteria or symbols, as is the case in the natural and human sciences as well as other (modern) philosophies which tailor their methods to those of the sciences.

Rather, that which is given in phenomenology "is given only in the seeing and experiencing act itself." The essences are never given to an 'outside' observer without direct contact with a specific domain of experience. Phenomenology is an engagement of phenomena, while simultaneously a waiting for its self-givenness; it is not a methodical procedure of observation as if its object is stationary. Thus, the particular attitude (Geisteshaltung, lit. "disposition of the spirit" or "spiritual posture") of the philosopher is crucial for the disclosure, or seeing, of phenomenological facts. This attitude is fundamentally a moral one, where the strength of philosophical inquiry rests upon the basis of love. Scheler describes the essence of philosophical thinking as "a love-determined movement of the inmost personal self of a finite being toward participation in the essential reality of all possibles."

The movement and act of love is important for philosophy for two reasons: (1) If philosophy, as Scheler describes it, hearkening back to the Platonic tradition, is a participation in a "primal essence of all essences" (Urwesen), it follows that for this participation to be achieved one must incorporate within oneself the content or essential characteristic of the primal essence. For Scheler, such a primal essence is most characterized according to love, thus the way to achieve the most direct and intimate participation is precisely to share in the movement of love. It is important to mention, however, that this primal essence is not an objectifiable entity whose possible correlate is knowledge; thus, even if philosophy is always concerned with knowing, as Scheler would concur, nevertheless, reason itself is not the proper participative faculty by which the greatest level of knowing is achieved. Only when reason and logic have behind them the movement of love and the proper moral preconditions can one achieve philosophical knowledge. (2) Love is likewise important insofar as its essence is the condition for the possibility of the givenness of value-objects and especially the givenness of an object in terms of its highest possible value. Love is the movement which "brings about the continuous emergence of ever-higher value in the object--just as if it was streaming out from the object of its own accord, without any sort of exertion...on the part of the lover. ...true love opens our spiritual eyes to ever-higher values in the object loved." Hatred, on the other hand, is the closing off of oneself or closing one's eyes to the world of values. It is in the latter context that value-inversions or devaluations become prevalent, and are sometimes solidified as proper in societies. Furthermore, by calling love a movement, Scheler hopes to dispel the interpretation that love and hate are only reactions to felt values rather than the very ground for the possibility of value-givenness (or value-concealment). Scheler writes, "Love and hate are acts in which the value-realm accessible to the feelings of a being...is either extended or narrowed." Love and hate are to be distinguished from sensible and even psychical feelings; they are, instead, characterized by an intentional function (one always loves or hates something) and therefore must belong to the same anthropological sphere as theoretical consciousness and the acts of willing and thinking. Scheler, therefore calls love and hate, "spiritual feelings," and are the basis for an "emotive a priori" insofar as values, through love, are given in the same manner as are essences, through cognition. In short, love is a value-cognition, and insofar as it is determinative of the way in which a philosopher approaches the world, it is also indicative of a phenomenological attitude.

Material value-ethics

A fundamental aspect of Scheler's phenomenology is the extension of the realm of the a priori to include not only formal propositions, but material ones as well. Kant's identification of the a priori with the formal was a "fundamental error" which is the basis of his ethical formalism. Furthermore, Kant erroneously identified the realm of the non-formal (material) with sensible or empirical content. The heart of Scheler's criticism of Kant is within his theory of values. Values are given a priori, and are "feelable" phenomena. The intentional feeling of love discloses values insofar as love opens a person evermore to beings-of-value (Wertsein).

Additionally, values are not formal realities; they do not exist somewhere apart from the world and their bearers, and they only exist with a value-bearer, as a value-being. They are, therefore, part of the realm of a material a priori. Nevertheless, values can vary with respect to their bearers without there ever occurring an alteration in the object as bearer. E.g., the value of a specific work of art or specific religious articles may vary according to differences of culture and religion. However, this variation of values with respect to their bearers by no means amounts to the relativity of values as such, but only with respect to the particular value-bearer. As such, the values of culture are always spiritual irrespective of the objects that may bear this value, and values of the holy still remain the highest values regardless of their bearers. According to Scheler, the disclosure of the value-being of an object precedes representation. The axiological reality of values is given prior to knowing, but, upon being felt through value-feeling, can be known (as to their essential interconnections). 

Values and their corresponding disvalues are ranked according to their essential interconnections as follows:

 Religiously-relevant values (holy/unholy)
 Spiritual values (beauty/ugliness, knowledge/ignorance, right/wrong)
 Vital values (health/unhealthiness, strength/weakness)
 Sensible values (agreeable/disagreeable, comfort/discomfort)

Further essential interconnections apply with respect to a value's (disvalue's) existence or non-existence:

 The existence of a positive value is itself a positive value.
 The existence of a negative value (disvalue) is itself a negative value.
 The non-existence of a positive value is itself a negative value.
 The non-existence of a negative value is itself a positive value.

And with respect to values of good and evil:

 Good is the value that is attached to the realization of a positive value in the sphere of willing.
 Evil is the value that is attached to the realization of a negative value in the sphere of willing.
 Good is the value that is attached to the realization of a higher value in the sphere of willing.
 Evil is the value that is attached to the realization of a lower value [at the expense of a higher one] in the sphere of willing.

Goodness, however, is not simply "attached" to an act of willing, but originates ultimately within the disposition (Gesinnung) or "basic moral tenor" of the acting person. Accordingly:

 The criterion of 'good' consists in the agreement of a value intended, in the realization, with the value preferred, or in its disagreement with the value rejected.
 The criterion of 'evil' consists in the disagreement of a value intended, in the realization, with the value preferred, or in its agreement with the value rejected.

Scheler argued that most of the older ethical systems (Kantian formalism, theonomic ethics, nietzscheanism, hedonism, consequentialism, and platonism, for example) fall into axiological error by emphasizing one value-rank to the exclusion of the others. A novel aspect of Scheler's ethics is the importance of the "kairos" or call of the hour. Moral rules cannot guide the person to make ethical choices in difficult, existential life-choices. For Scheler, the very capacity to obey rules is rooted in the basic moral tenor of the person.

A disorder "of the heart" occurs whenever a person prefers a value of a lower rank to a higher rank, or a disvalue to a value.

The term Wertsein or value-being is used by Scheler in many contexts, but his untimely death prevented him from working out an axiological ontology. Another unique and controversial element of Scheler's axiology is the notion of the emotive a priori: values can only be felt, just as color can only be seen. Reason cannot think values; the mind can only
order categories of value after lived experience has happened. For Scheler, the person is the locus of value-experience, a timeless act-being that acts into time. Scheler's appropriation of a value-based metaphysics renders his phenomenology quite different from the phenomenology of consciousness (Husserl, Sartre) or the existential analysis of the being-in-the-world of Dasein (Heidegger). Scheler's concept of the "lived body" was appropriated in the early work of Maurice Merleau-Ponty.

Max Scheler extended the phenomenological method to include a reduction of the scientific method too, thus questioning the idea of Husserl that phenomenological philosophy should be pursued as a rigorous science. Natural and scientific attitudes (Einstellung) are both phenomenologically counterpositive and hence must be sublated in the advancement of the real phenomenological reduction which, in the eyes of Scheler, has more the shapes of an allround ascesis (Askese) rather than a mere logical procedure of suspending the existential judgments. The Wesenschau, according to Scheler, is an act of breaking down the Sosein limits of Sein A into the essential-ontological domain of Sein B, in short, an ontological participation of Sosenheiten, seeing the things as such (cf. the Buddhist concept of tathata, and the Christian theological quidditas).

Man and History (1924)
Scheler planned to publish his major work in Anthropology in 1929, but the completion of such a project was curtailed by his premature death in 1928. Some fragments of such work have been published in Nachlass. In 1924, Man and History (Mensch und Geschichte), Scheler gave some preliminary statements on the range and goal of philosophical anthropology.

In this book, Scheler argues for a tabula rasa of all the inherited prejudices from the three main traditions that have formulated an idea of man: religion, philosophy and science.Martin Buber Between man and man p.216 Scheler argues that it is not enough just to reject such traditions, as did Nietzsche with the Judeo-Christian religion by saying that "God is dead"; these traditions have impregnated all parts of our culture, and therefore still determine a great deal of the way of thinking even of those that don't believe in the Christian God. To really get freedom from such traditions it is necessary to study and deconstruct them (Husserl's term Abbau).

Scheler says that philosophical anthropology must address the totality of man, while it must be informed by the specialized sciences like biology, psychology, sociology, etc.

Works

 Zur Phänomenologie und Theorie der Sympathiegefühle und von Liebe und Hass, 1913
 Der Genius des Kriegs und der Deutsche Krieg, 1915
 Der Formalismus in der Ethik und die materiale Wertethik, 1913 - 1916
 Krieg und Aufbau, 1916
 Die Ursachen des Deutschenhasses, 1917
 Vom Umsturz der Werte, 1919
 Neuer Versuch der Grundlegung eines ethischen Personalismus, 1921
 Vom Ewigen im Menschen, 1921
 Probleme der Religion. Zur religiösen Erneuerung, 1921
 Wesen und Formen der Sympathie, 1923 (neu aufgelegt als Titel von 1913: Zur Phänomenologie ...)
 Schriften zur Soziologie und Weltanschauungslehre, 3 Bände, 1923/1924
 Die Wissensformen und die Gesellschaft, 1926
 Der Mensch im Zeitalter des Ausgleichs, 1927
 Die Stellung des Menschen im Kosmos, 1928
 Philosophische Weltanschauung, 1929
 Logik I. (Fragment, Korrekturbögen). Amsterdam 1975

English translations

 The Nature of Sympathy, New Haven: Yale University Press, 1954.
  144 pages.  (German title: Philosophische Weltanschauung.)

  480 pages.

  201 pages. .

  359 pages. .

  620 pages. . (Original German edition: Der Formalismus in der Ethik und die materiale Wertethik, 1913–16.)
  239 pages. .

  201 pages. .

  267 pages. .

  79 pages. .

See also
Axiological ethics
Ressentiment (Scheler)
Mimpathy

References

Sources

  205 pages. .

  221 pages. .

  282 pages. .

  223 pages.

  118 pages.

  176 pages.

  324 pages. .  2nd ed., 2001.

  260 pages. .  2nd ed., 2001.

  203 pages. .

  247 pages. .

  213 pages. .  (Original Dutch title: Max Scheler: De man en zijn werk'')

  130 pages.

  188 pages. .

  327 pages. .

External links

 Max-Scheler-Gesellschaft (Max Scheler Society) - German-language website
 
 
 Nature, Vol. 63. March 7, 1901, Book review of: Die Transcendentale Und Die Psychologische Methode, Method in Philosophy, Dr. Max F. Scheler, 1900
 The Monist, Vol 12, 1902 Book review of: Die Transcendentale Und Die Psychologische Methode, by Dr. Max F. Scheler 1900 in English
 Prof. Frings' Max Scheler Website (www.maxscheler.com)
 Photos of Max Scheler at web site of Center for Advanced Research in Phenomenology
 A Filosofia de Max Scheler (Portuguese-language website)
  (German)
 

1874 births
1928 deaths
19th-century essayists
19th-century German male writers
19th-century German philosophers
20th-century essayists
20th-century German philosophers
Catholic philosophers
German consciousness researchers and theorists
Christian continental philosophers and theologians
Epistemologists
German ethicists
German male essayists
German male non-fiction writers
German people of Jewish descent
Converts to Roman Catholicism from Judaism
German Roman Catholics
German sociologists
Jewish philosophers
Metaphysicians
Ontologists
People from the Kingdom of Bavaria
Phenomenologists
Philosophers of culture
Philosophers of education
Philosophers of love
Philosophers of mind
Philosophers of religion
Philosophical anthropology
Philosophy academics
Writers from Munich